Clavus wilmeri is a species of sea snail, a marine gastropod mollusk in the family Drilliidae.

Description
The shell grows to a length of 16 mm. The shell is sharply keeled and noduled on the periphery, with revolving striae below it, stronger towards the base. The shell is whitish, stained with chestnut at the apex and on the lower part of the body whorl. There is a row of chestnut dots between the nodules of the periphery.

Distribution
This species occurs in the demersal zone of the Andaman Islands.

References

 Tucker, J.K. 2004 Catalog of recent and fossil turrids (Mollusca: Gastropoda). Zootaxa 682:1-1295

External links

wilmeri
Gastropods described in 1879